Springtime may refer to:

 Spring (season), one of the four temperate seasons

Film and television
 Springtime (1920 film), an American silent comedy starring Oliver Hardy
 Springtime (1929 film), a Silly Symphonies animated Disney short film
 Springtime (1947 film), a Soviet musical-comedy-science-fiction film
 Springtime (2004 film), a South Korean film
 Springtime, a 1999 South Korean TV series starring Kim Hyun-joo
 "Springtime" (M*A*S*H), a 1974 television episode
 "Springtime" (Mickey Mouse), a 2018 television episode

Music
 Springtime (band), a band that represented Austria at Eurovision 1978
 Springtime (guitar), an experimental guitar created by Yuri Landman
 Springtime (Freakwater album), 1998
 Springtime (Springtime album), by the Australian supergroup Springtime, 2021

Painting
 Springtime (Claude Monet), an 1872 painting by Claude Monet
 Springtime (Pierre Auguste Cot), an 1873 painting by Pierre Auguste Cot 
, a latter 19th-century painting by Wilbur Winfield Woodward

Other uses
 Springtime!, an entertainment company and record label 
 Springtime, Montana, US, an unincorporated community

See also
 
 Primavera (disambiguation)
 Printemps (disambiguation)
 Spring (disambiguation)